M. Michael Einik (born 1949, New York State) is a member of the Board of Directors of the Bulgarian American Business Center and former American ambassador to Macedonia (1999-2002).  He was also Deputy Chief of Mission/Charge d’Affaire at the American Embassy in Bucharest, Romania (1995-1999), and Consul General at the American Consulate in Zagreb, Croatia.  He is CEO of Underwater Optical Technologies in Riga, Latvia.

Einik has an MBA in International Business from George Washington University (1972) and a BBA in Economics from the University of Miami (1971).

References

1949 births
People from New York (state)
George Washington University School of Business alumni
University of Miami alumni
Ambassadors of the United States to North Macedonia
American consuls
American chief executives
Living people
20th-century American diplomats
21st-century American diplomats